Christopher Curtis Nyman (born June 6, 1955) is an American former professional baseball first baseman. He played during two seasons at the Major League Baseball (MLB) for the Chicago White Sox.

Nyman is the brother of fellow former major leaguer Nyls Nyman.

Pro career
Nyman was drafted by the Chicago White Sox in the 21st round of the 1973 MLB draft out of Cordova High School in Tempe, Arizona. Instead of signing with the White Sox right away, Nyman opted to play college baseball for Arizona State. He made his pro debut for the Appleton Foxes, which was the Single-A team for the White Sox. Nyman made a steady climb up the ladder in the Sox system. Between 1978 and 1980, he split time between Appelton and the Sox Double A team, the Knoxville Sox.  In 1980, he finally made it to Triple A, and remained there the next season as well, as the White Sox changed their Triple-A affiliate from the Iowa Oaks to the Edmonton Trappers. 

Nyman made his major league debut for Chicago in 1982, where he split time at first base with starter Tom Paciorek and his back-up Mike Squires. Nyman started the 1983 season with the Denver Bears who had replaced the Trappers as the White Sox new Triple A affiliate. Nyman would spend part of the 1983 season with Chicago as well. He played his final game on the major league level on October 1st, 198e against the Seattle Mariners as a pinch runner for designated hitter Greg Luzinski. Nyman would end up scoring a run in the White Sox 9-3 win over Seattle. 

Nyman did not re-sign with Chicago, instead opting to go overseas. He spent the 1984 and 1985 seasons with the Nankai Hawks of the Japanese Pacific League. After two seasons in Japan, Nyman finished his career in the minor leagues, his final season for the Nashville Sounds, which was the Triple A club of the Detroit Tigers in 1986.

References

External links

1955 births
Living people
American expatriate baseball players in Canada
American expatriate baseball players in Japan
Appleton Foxes players
Arizona State Sun Devils baseball players
Baseball players from California
Buffalo Bisons (minor league) players
Chicago White Sox players
Denver Bears players
Edmonton Trappers players
Iowa Oaks players
Knoxville Sox players
Major League Baseball first basemen
Nankai Hawks players
Nashville Sounds players
Nippon Professional Baseball first basemen
Nippon Professional Baseball third basemen
Sportspeople from Pomona, California
American expatriate baseball players in Italy